Love Aaj Kal is a 2020 Indian Hindi-language romantic comedy-drama film directed by Imtiaz Ali and starring Kartik Aaryan and Sara Ali Khan in lead roles, with Randeep Hooda and Arushi Sharma in pivotal supporting roles. Principal photography began in the first half of March 2019 and ended in July 2019. It was released in India on Valentine's Day 2020. It is the spiritual successor to the 2009 film of the same name, starring Saif Ali Khan and Deepika Padukone, also directed by Ali.

Plot
Zoe and Veer meet at a bar. The two leave and decide to spend the night together at Veer's home, but Veer stops Zoe from continuing. He tells her that the time is not right. Zoe leaves infuriated. Veer keeps following Zoe, who finally confronts him and asks him not to follow her.

There is a flashback scene where Leena and Raghuvendra "Raghu" Singh have the same conversation back in Udaipur.

Back to the present day, Veer drops her for an interview at the office of the Mehta Group, and they slowly begin their relationship. Raj, who is affiliated with the Mehta Group, is an ex-medical student who ran away from Udaipur and now owns several restaurants in Delhi, including the café at which Zoe hangs out very often. Raj, who is good friends with Zoe, tells her the story of his childhood sweetheart, Leena, implying that he is a grown-up Raghu. He tells her that he used to behave with Leena just as Veer acts with Zoe, recites his childhood memories with Leena to Zoe, and tells her how he asked Leena for a dance together.

Again in a flashback, it is seen that Raghu and Leena used to meet each other secretly and how Raghu left everything for Leena and moved for her to Delhi, discontinuing his studies to be with Leena. Later, Zoe walks in on Raj and a woman, assuming she is Leena but realizes it's not the case. Raj now reveals that he left Leena for his big town fantasies. Her mother convinces Zoe that she can't possibly have both her love and career together. She goes to meet Veer's parents but leaves crying. Veer relays to Raj what Zoe did, and Raj, convinced that he influenced Zoe towards behaving this way, responds by getting her the job.

Some days later, Zoe sees Veer with another girl. Heartbroken, she hangs out with multiple people but doesn't happen to like any of them. She goes to a bar with a guy and gets drunk, but he refuses to drop her at her home. Veer picks her and drops her at her house. He says that he can't enter a relationship of compromises with Zoe and breaks up with her. The next day he informs her about a new job in the Himalayas and is leaving for two years, explaining that he has as much right to be focused on his career as does she, and bids her goodbye. Zoe gets a proposal from the Mehta family for marriage, but she refuses. When Zoe meets Raghu, he tells her that he met Leena one last time, when he realized he lost the person he was before with Leena and finds that she is pregnant. He leaves from there, gets into a cab, and goes to the airport. He adds that he still misses Leena but is helpless now. He starts crying, and Zoe comforts him. Raghu tells her that she shouldn't make the same mistake he made. Zoe leaves for the Himalayas to reunite with Veer. She sees Veer sleeping outside. She goes and lays on top of him. She says that she won't balance between love & work ever, but still, she wanted to be with him. Veer asks whether she will leap with him, to which she agrees, and they reunite.

Cast 
 Kartik Aaryan in a dual role as 
Veer Taneja, Zoe's boyfriend
Raghvendra "Raghu" Singh alias Raj
 Sara Ali Khan as Zoe Chauhan, Veer's girlfriend
 Randeep Hooda as Raghvendra "Raghu" Singh (adult Raj)
 Arushi Sharma as Leena Gupta, Raghu ex-love interest
 Siddharth Shaw as Mr. Rathore
 Simone Singh as Mrs. Chauhan, Zoe's mother
 Siddharth Kak as Harshwardhan Mehta
 Pranati Rai Prakash as Office Girl
 Kavita Ghai as Mrs. Taneja, Veer's mother
 Shataf Figar as Mr. Taneja, Veer's father
 Vedika Haralalka as Lily, Zoe's friend
 Monika Panwar as Sweety

Production
On 17 January 2019, it was reported that Imtiaz Ali was considering his next venture (a romantic drama) with Kartik Aaryan and Sara Ali Khan. On 1 March 2019, it was confirmed that the pair has been teamed up in a directorial venture of Ali and the filming will start in Delhi.

The principal photography of the film began in the second week of March 2019, with Aaryan sharing a picture of Khan and him from the sets. Khan also shared the picture on her social media account. The first schedule of the film was wrapped on 25 March 2019. To inform about the conclusion of the schedule, Khan posted a video on her Instagram  to celebrate. The 20-day second schedule of the film began on 10 April in Udaipur. Filming was completed on 1 July 2019, after the final 66 days of shooting in Himachal Pradesh.

Release
Love Aaj Kal was released in India on 14 February 2020. The film was made available for streaming on Netflix and JioCinema on 28 April 2020. Love Aaj Kal's television premiere occurred on Star Plus a few months after its theatrical release.

Music 

The film's songs are composed by Pritam, with lyrics written by Irshad Kamil and the album was well received by the audiences. Every soundtrack in the album has its own flavour and emotion which was used as the narrative.  

The film score was composed by Ishaan Chhabra. The film variant of the reprise version of "Shayad" is sung by Jubin Nautiyal, released April 2021. 

In the film credits the song "Aur Tanha" is entitled "Tanna Karta" and song "Shayad" sung by Arijit Singh for Pre-Interval and Jubin Nautiyal for Post-Interval.

The song "Shayad (Aaj Kal)" also sung by Pritam featuring Arijit Singh by title "Shayad (Aaj Kal) Lockdown Version" uploaded on Pritam's YouTube Channel. All songs under label Sony Music India.

Reception

Critical response
The film received mixed reviews from critics and audiences. Ronak Kotecha of the Times of India rated the film 3/5, stating that "the flashback story is interrupted way too many times to accommodate the film's non-linear narrative." Baradwaj Rangan of Film Companion wrote "Despite its many imperfections, if there's one thing that gladdened me about LAK-2020, it's that IA hasn't lost his ability to write those great scenes we want (and expect) from him." Bollywood Hungama gave the film 3/5 stars. Indian Express rated the film 1.5/5 stars.

Box office
Love Aaj Kal earned  nett at the domestic box office on its opening day. On the second day, the film collected . On the third day, the film collected , taking its total opening weekend collection to  nett.

References

External links
 

2020 films
Indian romantic drama films
2020s Hindi-language films
Films shot in Rajasthan
Films shot in Himachal Pradesh
Films set in Rajasthan
Films shot in Delhi
2020 romantic drama films